Soundatti  is a village in the southern state of Karnataka, India. It is located in the Raybag taluk of Belgaum district in Karnataka.

Demographics
 India census, Soundatti had a population of 8761 with 4507 males and 4254 females. It is situated on Krishna river.

See also
 Saundatti
 Belgaum
 Districts of Karnataka

References

External links
 http://Belgaum.nic.in/

Villages in Belagavi district